Karattadipalayam is a village in Gobichettipalayam Taluk of Erode district in Tamil Nadu. It is part of the Lakkampatti town panchayat. Gobi Arts and Science College, an autonomous institution affiliated to Bharathiar University, is situated in Karattadipalayam.

References

Villages in Erode district

Notable residents 
G. V. Loganathan, former Virginia Tech professor and victim of the 2007 Virginia Tech shooting